Kii can refer to:

History
 Kii House, a branch family of the Tokugawa clan that ruled Japan during the Edo era

Company 
 Kii Corporation, a mobile cloud services company (MBaaS)

Geography 
 Kii Channel, a separating Honshū and Shikoku islands of Japan.
 Kii Mountains, a mountain range in the Kansai region of Japan.
 Kii Province, a former province of Japan.
 Kii Peninsula, a peninsula in the Kansai region of Japan.
 Kii Ōshima, an island off Shiono Point, the tip of the Kii Peninsula

Train stations 
 Kii Station, a train station in Wakayama, Wakayama Prefecture, Japan
 Kii-Arita Station, a train station in Kushimoto, Higashimuro District, Wakayama Prefecture, Japan
 Kii-Gobō Station, a train station in Gobō, Wakayama Prefecture, Japan
 Kii-Hiki Station, a train station in Shirahama, Nishimuro District, Wakayama Prefecture, Japan
 Kii-Hime Station, a train station in Kushimoto, Higashimuro District, Wakayama Prefecture, Japan
 Kii-Hosokawa Station, a train station in Kōya, Ito District, Wakayama Prefecture, Japan
 Kii-Ichigi Station, a train station in Mihama, Minamimuro District, Mie Prefecture, Japan
 Kii-Ida Station, a train station in Kihō, Minamimuro District, Mie Prefecture, Japan
 Kii-Ida Station, a train station in Kihō, Minamimuro District, Mie Prefecture, Japan
 Kii-Kamiya Station, a train station in Kōya, Ito District, Wakayama Prefecture, Japan
 Kii-Katsuura Station, a train station in Nachikatsuura, Higashimuro District, Wakayama Prefecture
 Kii-Miyahara Station, a train station in Arida, Wakayama Prefecture, Japan
 Kii-Nagashima Station, a train station in Kihoku, Kitamuro District, Mie Prefecture, Japan
 Kii-Nakanoshima Station, a train station in Wakayama, Wakayama Prefecture, Japan
 Kii-Ogura Station, a train station in Wakayama, Wakayama Prefecture, Japan
 Kii-Sano Station, a train station in Shingū, Wakayama Prefecture, Japan
 Kii-Shimizu Station, a train station in Hashimoto, Wakayama Prefecture, Japan
 Kii-Shinjō Station, a train station in Tanabe, Wakayama Prefecture, Japan
 Kii-Tahara Station, a train station in Kushimoto, Higashimuro District, Wakayama Prefecture, Japan
 Kii-Tanabe Station, a train station in Tanabe, Wakayama Prefecture, Japan
 Kii-Temma Station, a train station in Nachikatsuura, Higashimuro District, Wakayama Prefecture, Japan
 Kii-Tonda Station, a train station in Shirahama, Nishimuro District, Wakayama Prefecture, Japan
 Kii-Uchihara Station, a train station in Hidaka, Hidaka District, Wakayama Prefecture, Japan
 Kii-Uragami Station, a train station in Nachikatsuura, Higashimuro District, Wakayama Prefecture, Japan
 Kii-Yamada Station, a train station in Hashimoto, Wakayama Prefecture, Japan
 Kii-Yura Station, a train station in Yura, Hidaka District, Wakayama Prefecture, Japan

Other 
 Ki'i, a Hawaiian deity
 , a proposed class of Japanese battleships
 Kii Channel HVDC system, a submarine cable high voltage direct current transmission system
 Kii Kitano, a Japanese gravure idol and actress
 Kii Hunter—see Key Hunter (a former prime-time television detective series in Japan)